The Irish League in season 1905–06 comprised 8 teams, and Cliftonville and Distillery shared the championship after two drawn play-off matches.

League standings

Results

References
Northern Ireland - List of final tables (RSSSF)

1905-06
Ireland
Irish